Most of graduate education in Ballari city, Karnataka, India falls under the jurisdiction of Vijayanagara Sri Krishnadevaraya University and Visvesvaraya Technological University. The following is a list of prominent Educational institutions in the city:
Vijayanagara Institute of Medical Sciences
P.G. Center, Gulburga University
Taranath Ayurveda College
Government Polytechnic
Sanjay Gandhi Polytechnic
V.V.S. Polytechnic in Kolagal Road
Teacher's Training Institute
Shree Medha Degree College
St. Philomena's High School & Good Shepherd Convent
Founded in 1885.  In 1901, a technical class was run at the high school by the nuns of the Order of Good Shepherd, and the pupils were almost all Europeans or Eurasians.
St. Joseph's High School
St. John's High School & Junior College
Wardlaw Composite Jr. College
Founded as a school in 1846 by Rev. R S Wardlaw, D.D. of the London Mission, and raised to second grade college in 1891. For a long time, it was the only Arts college in the Ceded Districts. In 1903-04 it had an average daily attendance of 319 students, of whom 17 were in F.A.Class. This is the oldest educational institution in the Bellary town and continues to offer education to the people of Bellary to date. Prof. U. R. Rao of ISRO studied in this institute.
Maddikera Bhimayya Sonta Linganna [M.B.S.L] High School
Bala Bharati Vivekananda High School
London Mission Telugu Primary School
Municipal Junior College
This school on Ananthapur Road is over 150 years old. One of the oldest institutions in the town, it was started as a composite school for students from the Class IV elementary to Class VI form school final with English as the medium of instruction along with other languages like Telugu, Kannada and Urdu, besides ancient languages such as Sanskrit, Arabic and Persian.
John Neale was the first headmaster of the school, followed by eminent people such as Arcot Ranganath Mudaliar, T. D. Logan, Arcot Bheemachar, K. S. Vedantham, B. Madhava Rao, and Bahadur S. Seshagiri Rao. The foundation for the present building on Anantapur Road was laid on 16 July 1926 by R. G. Grieve, Director of Public Instruction, Government of Madras when Nagaruru Narayana Rao was the chairman of the Bellary Municipality
Moulana Abul Kalam Azad High School (MAKA High School)
The Municipal High School was bifurcated in the 1950s and the Municipal Muslim High School, was later renamed Moulana Abul Kalam Azad High School. Janaab Meer Mohammed Hussain became the headmaster of the new school.
Bellary Institute of Technology and Management (formerly Bellary Engineering College)
Kendriya Vidyalaya in Cowl Bazaar
Heerada Sugamma Model Higher Primary School
Shettra Gurushantappa Junior College
Veerasaiva College (Arts, Commerce & Science)
Kotturswamy College of Education
Allam Sumangalamma Memorial Women's College
Vunki Sannarudrappa Law College
Rao Bahadur Y. Mahabaleshwarappa Engineering College (formerly Vijayanagar Engineering College)
Togari Veeramallappa Memorial College of Pharmacy
Kittur Rani Chennamma Girl's High School
V.V. Sangha's Polytechnic
Allum Karibasappa Institute of Management (formerly Vijayanagara Institute of Management)
Pupil Tree School
Dream World School
Nandi School & College
Sri Chaithanya School and College
Nalandha School and College
Bellary Residential School and College
ICFAI University in Moka Road
Basavarajarajeswari Public School and College
Sri Matha College
Sathyam Group of Institutions
SSS Govt. First Grade College
Ashirvaad School
Vasavi School
Vyana Vidyalaya
 BEST School and PU College
Bellary Educational Service's Trust, generally known as BeST School.

References